Cement clinker is a solid material produced in the manufacture of Portland cement as an intermediary product. It is produced by sintering (fusing together without melting to the point of liquefaction) limestone and aluminosilicate materials such as clay during the cement kiln stage.

Composition and preparation
The Portland clinker essentially consists of four minerals: two calcium silicates, alite (Ca3Si) and belite (Ca2Si), along with tricalcium aluminate (Ca3Al) and calcium aluminoferrite (Ca4AlFe) (Ca3Si), Ca2Si, Ca3Al, Ca4AlFe are abbreviations reflecting the stoichiometry of key elements). These main mineral phases are produced by heating at high temperature clays and limestone. The major raw material for the clinker-making is usually limestone mixed with a second material containing clay as a source of alumino-silicate. An impure limestone containing clay or silicon dioxide (SiO2) can be used. The calcium carbonate (CaCO3) content of these limestones can be as low as 80% by weight. The second raw material (materials in the rawmix other than limestone) depend on the purity of the limestone. Some of the second raw materials used are: clay, shale, sand, iron ore, bauxite, fly ash and slag.

Portland cement clinker is made by heating a homogeneous mixture of raw materials in a rotary kiln at high temperature. Aluminium oxide and iron oxide are present only as a flux to reduce the sintering temperature and contribute little to the cement strength. For special cements, such as low heat (LH) and sulfate resistant (SR) types, it is necessary to limit the amount of tricalcium aluminate formed.

The clinker and its hydration reactions are characterized and studied in detail by many techniques, including calorimetry, strength development, X-ray diffraction, scanning electron microscope and atomic force microscopy.

Uses
Portland cement clinker (abbreviated k in the European norms) is ground to a fine powder and used as the binder in many cement products. A small amount of gypsum (less than 5 wt.%) must be added to avoid the flash setting of the tricalcium aluminate (Ca3Al2O6), the most reactive mineral phase (exothermic hydration reaction) in Portland clinker. It may also be combined with other active ingredients or cement additions to produce other types of cement including, following the European  EN 197-1 standard:
 CEM I: pure Portland clinker (Ordinary Portland Cement, OPC)
 CEM II: composite cements with a limited addition of limestone filler or blast furnace slag (BFS)
 CEM III: BFS-OPC blastfurnace cements
 CEM IV: pozzolanic cements
 CEM V: composite cements (with large additions of BFS, fly ashes, or silica fume)

Clinker is one of the ingredients of an artificial rock called Pulhamite after its inventor. Other ingredients were Portland cement and sand. Pulhamite can be extremely convincing and was popular in creating natural looking rock gardens in the nineteenth century.

Clinker, if stored in dry conditions, can be kept for several months without appreciable loss of quality. Because of this, and because it can be easily handled by ordinary mineral handling equipment, clinker is internationally traded in large quantities. Cement manufacturers purchasing clinker usually grind it as an addition to their own clinker at their cement plants. Manufacturers also ship clinker to grinding plants in areas where cement-making raw materials are not available.

Clinker grinding aids
Gypsum is added to clinker primarily as an additive preventing the flash settings of the cement, but it is also very effective to facilitate the grinding of clinker by preventing agglomeration and coating of the powder at the surface of balls and mill wall.

Organic compounds are also often added as grinding aids to avoid powder agglomeration. Triethanolamine (TEA) is commonly used at 0.1 wt. % and has proved to be very effective. Other additives are sometimes used, such as ethylene glycol, oleic acid, and dodecyl-benzene sulfonate.

Clinker minerals hydration
Upon addition of water, clinker minerals react to form different types of hydrates and "set"(harden) as the hydrated cement paste becomes concrete. The calcium silicate hydrates (C-S-H) (hydrates of alite and belite minerals) represent the main "glue" components of the concrete. After initial setting the concrete continues to harden and to develop its mechanical strength. The first 28 days are the most critical for the hardening. The concrete does not dry but one says that it sets and hardens. The cement is a hydraulic binder whose hydration requires water. It can perfectly set under water. Water is essential to its hardening and water losses must be avoided at the young age to avoid the development of cracks. Young concrete is protected against desiccation (evaporation of unreacted water).  Traditional methods for preventing desiccation involve covering the product with wet burlap or use of plastic sheeting..  For larger projects, such as highways, the surface is sprayed with a solution of curing compound that leaves a water-impermeable coating.

Contribution to global warming 
, cement production contributed about 8% of all carbon emissions worldwide, contributing substantially to global warming. Most of those emissions were produced in the clinker manufacturing process.

See also 
 Clinker (waste)
 Environmental impact of concrete

References

Cement
Concrete
Limestone
Climate forcing